The siege of Ueda was staged in 1600 by Tokugawa Hidetada, son of the warlord Tokugawa Ieyasu, against Ueda castle garrison in Shinano province, which was controlled by the Sanada family.

Hidetada came across the castle as he marched his army along the Nakasendō (central mountain road) from Edo to rendezvous with his father's forces. Sanada Masayuki resisted, and Sanada Yukimura, son of Masayuki, was able to fight Hidetada's 38,000 men with only 2,000. However, when the castle did not fall as quickly as Hidetada had hoped and expected, he gave up and abandoned the siege and hurried to meet up with his father. As a result of this delay, Hidetada missed the battle of Sekigahara, the decisive victory in his father's unification of Japan.

References

Turnbull, Stephen (1998). 'The Samurai Sourcebook'. London: Cassell & Co.

1600 in Japan
Ueda 1600
Ueda 1600
Conflicts in 1600